Yvonne Andersson, born 1951, is a Swedish Christian democratic politician. She was especially active in academic debates. She has been a member of the Riksdag from 1998 to 2014.

References 

1951 births
Living people
Members of the Riksdag from the Christian Democrats (Sweden)
Women members of the Riksdag
Members of the Riksdag 1998–2002
Members of the Riksdag 2002–2006
Members of the Riksdag 2006–2010
Members of the Riksdag 2010–2014
20th-century Swedish women politicians
20th-century Swedish politicians
21st-century Swedish women politicians
Linköping University alumni